is a video game designer and composer, as well as rock drummer. He has worked at Xtalsoft, Square, and AlphaDream where he is primarily known for directing Super Mario RPG as well as his involvement in several Mario & Luigi games. He is currently a member of Earthbound Papas, a band led by Nobuo Uematsu.

Career
Fujioka began his career as a sound designer and composer at Xtalsoft in 1983 and quickly distinguished himself in a management capacity. He first collaborated with Ryuji Sasai on the soundtrack to Mugen no Shinzou III. When Xtalsoft was absorbed to become the Osaka branch of Technology and Entertainment Software in 1990, Fujioka became a director of the department. His first work with Square was as director of Final Fantasy Legend III on which he work with Sasai again on the soundtrack. His third involvement with Sasai was on Final Fantasy Mystic Quest with Sasai as sole composer and Fujioka writing. His most prominent role was as director of Super Mario RPG. Fujioka left Square in 2000 with a number of other employees to form AlphaDream, where he directed a number of their early games, including Tomato Adventure and a number of Hamtaro games, as well as helped design multiple Mario & Luigi games.

In addition to his game development work, Fujioka served as a drummer for a progressive rock band called Mr. Sirius. He also joined Nobuo Uematsu's band, Earthbound Papas.

Works

References

External links
Heads and Shell Inc. - Chihiro Fujioka's website 
 

1959 births
Living people
Japanese composers
Japanese male composers
Japanese video game designers
Japanese video game directors
Nintendo people
People from Osaka Prefecture
Square Enix people
Video game composers